Kurds are the largest people in the world without their own ethnic state. There is approximately 27 million Kurds are spread all over the world today, the vast majority live in the Middle East, especially in Turkey. Large Kurdish communities can also found in Armenia, Azerbaijan, Germany, and Sweden. The majority of the Kurds in Syria immigrated from Turkey to the French Mandate the 20th century, in order to escape the harsh repression of the Kurds in that country.

Background 
Kurds are known to have lived in present day Syria since centuries. Since the 7th century, several Kurds were influential religious notables in the region. The Krak de Chevalier is known as the Hisn al Akrad (Fortress of the Kurds) to the Arab speaking population as the Mirdasid prince of Aleppo entrusted Kurds stationed in the fortress to protect the trade routes between Homs and Hama from 1029 t0 1038. Kurdish warriors were known since the Zengi recruited a strong contingent of Kurds for their military. In the Ayyubid era, Saladin established himself in Damascus, where he had lived during his youth. His brother Turan Schah was to govern Syria.

20th century Immigration waves 
Large groups of Kurds drifted out of Turkey throughout the interwar period during which the Turkish campaign to assimilate its Kurdish population was at its highest. In reference to this, Kurdish studies expert Jordi Tejel claims:

Until the beginning of the 20th century, Al-Hasakah Governorate (then called Jazira province) was a "no man's land" primarily reserved for the grazing land under the control of nomadic and semi-sedentary Shammar and Tayy Arab tribes. These first waves of Kurds arrived with the laying of the Aleppo-Baghdad part of the Berlin-Baghdad railway. When Maurice Abadie, a French general, was overseeing the French occupation of Syria, he made observations on the history of Kurdish settlement in Syria and the area to the west of the Euphrates in general:

French mandate era (1920-1946) 
During World War I and subsequent years, thousands of Assyrians fled their homes in Anatolia after massacres and established towns such as Qamishli, Qubour Al-Bid (later renamed Al-Qahtaniya) and Al-Malikiyah. During the 1920s, the military situation in southeastern Turkey deteriorated. In February and March 1925, the Kurdish cleric Sheikh Said led a rebillion in the northern parts of Diyarbakir Province and conquered large swathes of southeastern Turkey, besieging the city of Diyarbekir. The rebellion forced tens of thousands of Kurds to flee their homes in the mountains of Turkey and cross into Syria. This rebellion was the first major rebellion in a long series of rebellions and conflicts between the Kurdish population and Kemalist authorities. The number of Kurds settled in the Jazira province during the 1920s was estimated at 20,000 to 25,000 people. These numbers made a huge demographic shift in the Jazira's population that was estimated at 40,000 in 1929.

The French Mandate authorities encouraged this Kurdish immigration  and granted them considerable rights, including Syrian citizenship, in its bigger minority autonomy campaign as part of a divide and rule strategy. This favorable policy towards Kurdish immigration into Syria was part of the a plan executed by French officer Pierre Terrier (and became known as the Terrier Plan) aiming at creating majority/minority rifts in Syria. The Terrier Plan shaped what is known as the Kurdish policy by mandatory authorities. This plan also used the new immigrants in its "sedentarization" (or pacification) project aiming at reclaiming large swathes of land in order to make the mandate financially more profitable for the French. In his zeal to increase the population of the area, Terrier has even sometimes contradicted the directives of the French High Commissariat in Beirut. Some of the new arrivals worked with the French against the local population. A prime example is the Kurdish tribal chief Hadjo Agha of the influential Havergan tribe who immigrated from Turkey together with more than 600 families, including arms and sheep, and settled in al-Qahtaniyah. In different parts of Syria, the French recruited heavily from the Kurds and other minority groups such as Alawite and Druze, for its local armed forces.

The French official reports show the existence of at most 45 Kurdish villages in Jazira prior to 1927. A new wave of refugees arrived in 1929. The mandatory authorities continued to encourage Kurdish immigration into Syria, and by 1939, the villages numbered between 700 and 800. These continuous waves swelled the number of Kurds in the area, and French geographers Fevret and Gibert estimated that in 1953 out of the total 146,000 inhabitants of Jazira, agriculturalist Kurds made up 60,000 (41%), semi-sedentary and nomad Arabs 50,000 (34%), and a quarter of the population were Christians.

The French authorities themselves generally organized the settlement of the refugees. One of the most important of these plans was carried out in Upper Jazira in northeastern Syria where the French built new towns and villages such as Qamishli (in 1926) and al-Malikiyah (then called Dijlah or Tigre in French) with the intention of housing the Turkish and Iraqi refugees considered to be "friendly" (Christians and Kurds). This has further encouraged the non-Turkish minorities that were under Turkish pressure to leave their ancestral homes and property, they could find refuge and rebuild their lives in relative safety in neighboring Syria. Consequently, the border areas in al-Hasakah Governorate between Qamishli and al-Malikiyah started to have a Kurdish majority, while Arabs remained the majority in river plains and elsewhere.

Due to the successive waves of immigration, especially those of Kurds from Turkey, the population of northeastern Syria has seen several big, unnatural jumps (as shown in the table). For example, the Jazira population jumped by 42.7% between 1931 and 1932. Likewise, the population jumped by 45.8% between 1933 and 1935. Another very significant jump happened in 1953 when the population swelled by 30.8% compared to the year before.

The French geographer Robert Montagne summarized the situation in 1932 as follows:

In 1939, French mandate authorities reported the following population numbers for the different ethnic and religious groups in al-Hasakah city centre.

After World War II 
Illegal immigration along the border from Ras al-Ayn to al-Malikiyya continued after WWII. Another major wave of illegal Kurdish immigrants settled down in the region along the border in major population centers such as Al-Darbasiyah, Amuda and al-Malikiyya. Many of these Kurds were able to register themselves illegally in the Syrian civil registers. They were also able to obtain Syrian identity cards through a variety of means, with the help of their relatives and members of their tribes. It is thought that the land reform encouraged their immigration in an effort to benefit from socialist-style land redistribution. Official figures available in 1961 showed that in a mere seven-year period, between 1954 and 1961, the population of al-Hasakah governorate had increased from 240,000 to 305,000, an increase of 27% which could not possibly be explained merely by natural increase. The government was sufficiently worried by the apparent influx that it carried out a sample census in June 1962 which indicated the real population was probably closer to 340,000. The huge unemployment due to mechanization, harsh working conditions and political instability in Turkey are all factors that have further encouraged immigration out of Turkey.

Immigration to northwestern Syria 
Although mostly concentrated in the northeast due to the proximity of Kurdistan, Kurds immigrated to other parts of Syria. For example, a group of Kurdish Alevis who fled the persecution of the Turkish Army during the Dersim Massacre, settled in Mabeta in the 1930s.

Town and village establishment in the area 
An account of the number of settlements for the new immigrants and their locations in Syrian Jazira is given by the French geographer Etienne de Vaumas. These settlements were created to help the newcomers work in mechanized agricultural projects. As of 1932, in the Kamishliye (Qamishli) region, one town, 28 villages, 48 hamlets and 29 isolated farms for future villages were established. To the north of Ain Diwar (in al-Malikiyah district, almost 90 villages were erected. The number of villages was estimated by the French intelligence officer in Hasakah (regional capital) at 250 in 1929. This number jumped to 336 in 1935.

Kurdish tribes immigrating to Syria 
French geographer Pierre Rondot provides a precious, detailed account of the settlement areas for the native and incoming tribes of Jazira, extending his focus to the Taurus Mountains in Turkey. In the Syrian Jazira region he mentions the following Kurdish tribes in the Qamishli area and comments on their origins in Turkey and current establishment locations:

 Tchities: descended from the northern mountains under the leadership of Xelaf Axa and established to the east of Qamishli
 Pinar Ali: agricultural workers living in villages west of Qamishli where they do not own land
 Dakouri: settled farmers
 Kiki: settled farmers
 Milli: settled farmers

Rondot reports that the establishment of all of these tribes is recent but events have evolved rapidly with the development of agricultural projects in the area.
In the Derik-Ain Diwar area, Rondot mentions the Hesenan, Harunan and Alikan tribes, all of which had descended from the mountains to the north three or four generations ago.

Political influence of Turkish Kurds in Syria 
The Kurdish immigration from Turkey has provided most of the Kurdish leaders in Syria, notably the Badr Khan family, Dr. Ahmad Nazif, and Hassan Hajo Agha.

References 

Kurdish diaspora
Political history of Syria